Yangikent (Yañıgent; Kaitag: Йагъиккент) is a rural locality (a selo) and the administrative centre of Yangikentsky Selsoviet, Kaytagsky District, Republic of Dagestan, Russia. The population was 1,248 as of 2010. There are 23 streets.

Geography 
Yangikent is located 12 km north of Madzhalis (the district's administrative centre) by road, on the Yangichay River. Chumli and Gulli are the nearest rural localities.

Nationalities 
Kumyks and Dargins live there.

References 

Rural localities in Kaytagsky District